Jack Henry Plom (born 27 August 1999) is an English cricketer. He made his first-class debut on 7 April 2018 for Essex against Cambridge MCCU as part of the Marylebone Cricket Club University fixtures. He made his Twenty20 debut on 11 September 2020, for Essex in the 2020 t20 Blast. He made his List A debut on 29 July 2021, for Essex in the 2021 Royal London One-Day Cup.

References

External links
 

1999 births
Living people
English cricketers
Essex cricketers
Surrey cricketers
Sportspeople from Basildon
English cricketers of the 21st century